The 1975–76 FA Vase was the second season of the FA Vase, an annual football competition for teams in the lower reaches of the English football league system.

Billericay Town won the competition, beating Stamford in the final.

Quarter-finals

Semi-finals

Billericay Town won 2–1 on aggregate.

Stamford won 5–2 on aggregate.

Final

References

FA Vase
FA Vase
FA Vase seasons